The New York City Jazz Record is a monthly New York City based publication that includes features, reviews and concert announcements regarding jazz music. It is available in print form (black and white hardcopy) as well as online at www.nycjazzrecord.com (in full color). It was launched in May 2002 by co-founders Laurence Donohue-Greene (Managing Editor) and Andrey Henkin (Editorial Director/Production Manager) under the name AllAboutJazz-New York. The gazette’s name change switched permanently to The New York City Jazz Record as of March 2011.

Saxophonist Joe Lovano says of The New York City Jazz Record: "Simply the hippest journal about jazz in New York that has ever been published.” It has been nominated on many occasions as “Best Jazz Periodical” by the Jazz Journalists Association (2006, 2007, 2009-2022) and is distributed throughout New York City at hundreds of locations - from jazz clubs and record stores to instrument stores, schools and universities. The New York City Jazz Record includes extensive features and CD reviews dedicated to promoting NYC jazz performances and events.

References

External links
 Official website

Jazz publications
Publications established in 2002
2002 establishments in New York City

Jazz magazines